Lingus may refer to:

 Lingus, album by the American rock band Amnesia
 Lingus, song from the album We Like It Here by the American jazz fusion group Snarky Puppy
 Culinaire Lingus, album by the French progressive rock band Ange
 Aer Lingus, flag carrier airline of Ireland